The Rodin-class ferries are a duo of ferries operated by DFDS, formerly by SeaFrance and MyFerryLink. The two ferries were built between 2001 and 2005 and operate between Dover and Calais.

References

DFDS
Ships built in Finland
Ferry classes